Lawrence Reynolds (July 13, 1944 – August 15, 2000) was an American country singer. He had a hit single with "Jesus Is a Soul Man" in 1969, which hit No. 28 on the US Billboard Hot 100 chart. 
"Jesus Is a Soul Man" was co-written by Jack D Cardwell. He released an album in 1970, also called Jesus Is a Soul Man, which peaked at No. 45 on the U.S. Country Albums chart in 1970.

Reynolds was born in St. Stephens, Alabama. He died of coronary artery disease August 15, 2000 and was buried at Three Forks Baptist Church in Bigbee, Alabama.

Discography

Albums

Singles

Note: US Record World singles chart

References

American country singer-songwriters
Musicians from Mobile, Alabama
2000 deaths
1944 births
20th-century American singers
Country musicians from Alabama
Singer-songwriters from Alabama